Biscay is a province in the autonomous community of the Basque Country, Spain. It is divided into 111 municipalities.

See also

Geography of Spain
List of cities in Spain

Biscay